The Fordyce Commercial Historic District encompasses the historic heart of Fordyce, Arkansas, the county seat of Dallas County.  It encompasses four city blocks of North Main Street, between 1st and 4th, and includes properties on these adjacent streets.  Fordyce was founded in 1882, and the oldest building in the district, the Nutt-Trussell Building at 202 North Main Street, was built .  Spurred by the logging industry and the Cotton Belt Railroad, Fordyce's downtown area had 25 buildings by 1901, and continued to grow over the next few decades, resulting in a concentration of period commercial architecture in its downtown.  The district was listed on the National Register of Historic Places in 2008.

Interesting buildings in the district include the Fordyce Home Accident Insurance Company building at 300-302 North Main, designed by Charles L. Thompson and built in 1908, and Bob's Barber Shop, a relatively unaltered  building on the 100 block of North Main.

See also
National Register of Historic Places listings in Dallas County, Arkansas

References

Victorian architecture in Arkansas
Geography of Dallas County, Arkansas
Historic districts on the National Register of Historic Places in Arkansas
Fordyce, Arkansas
National Register of Historic Places in Dallas County, Arkansas